Tal Banin (born March 7, 1971) is an Israeli retired football player and currently the manager of Maccabi Ahi Nazareth. Banin played as a defensive midfielder. A captain for the Israeli National Team for many years, Banin was also the only Israeli player to ever play in the Italian Serie A until 2011, when Palermo signed Eran Zahavi.

Career
Born in Kiryat Haim, Haifa, Israel, Banin joined Hapoel Haifa as a youngster. He trained in their football academy and played for many of Hapoel's youth teams. He made his full debut for the side at 17. Between the years of 1987–89 Banin played a total of 44 games for Hapoel in the second division and scored seven goals.

When Banin was 19 he signed a contract with arch rivals Maccabi Haifa in 1989, they continued his impressive development as a player. He left the club in 1992 after playing 94 games in ligat ha`hal and scoring seventeen goals.

When Banin was just 20 he became the second youngest Israeli to collect the "Player of the Year" accolade in 1991. During the same season he was an integral part in the Maccabi side that won the Israeli League and Cup "double".

Banin then returned to Hapoel Haifa, where he played for a further season playing 29 games and scoring 8 goals in the top division.

In 1993 Banin moved to French side Cannes. He led the side to a sixth position in Ligue 1, the French top division. As a result, Cannes qualified for Europe.

Whilst playing for Cannes, Banin picked up a knee injury. This problem proved to be serious. He began to suffer from a chronic knee problem that would plague him for the rest of his career.

Cannes offered to extend his contract, however after 23 games and two goals Banin declined and returned to Israel to join Hapoel Haifa. He proved to be their star player in what seemed to be a very average side. He remained at Haifa for three years playing a further 74 games for them and scoring 19 goals.

In 1997 Banin was on the move again, this time to Brescia in Italy. He played 26 games for them, scoring one goal. During that year Banin aggravated his knee injury and was unable to prevent Brescia from slipping from Serie A to Serie B. The next year Banin sat out the season through injury but a year later he oversaw Brescia's triumphant return to the top division.

At the insistence of his wife, Banin returned to Israel to sign for Maccabi Tel Aviv. He became vital to the side, and was moulded into the spine of the team. Banin led Maccabi to victory in the State Cup in 2002.

The next season Banin helped Maccabi lift the league title for the first time since 1996.

In the next season's UEFA Champions League, Maccabi were knocked out in the first round. Head Coach Nir Klinger blamed it on the fights between Banin and Maccabi legend Avi Nimni. As a result, on August 13, 2003, they were both kicked out of the side. For a while, Banin was unable to find a team that would accept his high wage demands for the 2003–04 season. He finally moved to play for Bnei Yehuda for the remainder of the season.

In January 2005, Beitar Jerusalem signed the midfielder for the remainder of the 2004–05 season. Beitar were desperate for some steel in the middle after a run of humiliating defeats, aiming to try to avoid relegation.

Banin finished his career in Maccabi Netanya.

International career
During his career Banin was called up to the Israeli national side due to his hard work in the middle of the field. Banin made his debut on May 16, 1990, against the USSR (or Russia as they are now known). He scored to lead Israel to a 3–2 win at the Ramat Gan Stadium.

He captained the country from 1997 until 2003. Banin is considered one of the best defensive midfielders in the history of Israeli football.

Banin is a highly respected player in Europe, but unfortunately has been unable to fulfill his potential due to his crippling knee injury. Banin played 80 times for Israel scoring 12 goals.

Managerial career
On April 8, 2008, he was appointed as the assistant manager of Nitzan Shirazi in Maccabi Petah Tikva.

After only two months in Petah Tikva, he moved on to coach the Israel national under-17 football team for two years.

On July 25, 2010, Banin was appointed as the assistant manager of Luis Fernández in the Israel national football team.

In the 2011–12 season he worked as the manager of Hapoel Haifa, helping the club avoid relegation. The day after the season ended he immediately signed a two years contract in Maccabi Netanya replacing Reuven Atar. He was sacked from Maccabi Netanya on 18 March 2013.

In November 2013 he signed a two years contract with Maccabi Ahi Nazareth in the Liga Leumit.

On February 16, 2015, he was appointed as the manager of Hapoel Haifa, once more, in order to help the club in the battle against relegation.

Statistics

Honours
 Israeli Premier League: 1988–89, 1990–91, 2002–03
 Israel State Cup: 1991, 2001, 2002; runner-up 1995

See also
List of select Jewish football (association; soccer) players

References

External links
 The Stars Of Israeli Soccer: TAL BANIN

1971 births
Living people
Israeli Jews
Israeli footballers
Footballers from Haifa
Association football midfielders
Israel international footballers
Hapoel Haifa F.C. players
Maccabi Haifa F.C. players
AS Cannes players
Brescia Calcio players
Maccabi Tel Aviv F.C. players
Bnei Yehuda Tel Aviv F.C. players
Beitar Jerusalem F.C. players
Maccabi Netanya F.C. players
Liga Leumit players
Ligue 1 players
Serie A players
Serie B players
Israeli Premier League players
Israeli expatriate footballers
Expatriate footballers in France
Expatriate footballers in Italy
Israeli expatriate sportspeople in Italy
Israeli expatriate sportspeople in France
Israeli football managers
Hapoel Haifa F.C. managers
Maccabi Netanya F.C. managers
Maccabi Ahi Nazareth F.C. managers
Bnei Sakhnin F.C. managers
Israeli Premier League managers
Israeli Football Hall of Fame inductees
Israeli Footballer of the Year recipients